Shanmugasundaram, known by his stage name A.V.M. Rajan, (26 July 1935) is a former Indian actor in Tamil cinema who was active during the 1960s and 1970s. Born in Pudukottai, Shanmugasundaram was very eager to join cinema though he held a bachelor's degree in mathematics from Madras University. His higher secondary was at Christian Sweden Mission High School. His parents wanted to see him as a police officer. He came to Madras to write the examination, but didn't fit for the exam. He was not confident as he couldn't straighten his left hand fractured at the age of 14. Instead, while working at Raj Bhavan Guindy Chennai, he tried his luck in cinema knocking on the doors of every film company to earn a better income. At long last, his relentless efforts yielded result by getting him the opportunity to enter cinema through the film Aayiram Kaalathu Payiru in which he was introduced as "Raja B.A.". Soon after, he was signed to act in the AVM's film Naanum Oru Penn also.

Rajan acted in a movie produced by AVM Productions called Naanum Oru Penn, a film that starred S.S.Rajendran in the lead role. Hence he became 'A.V.M.' Rajan. Tamil actress Pushpalatha appeared in the same picture, and they became a couple and later married. They subsequently acted as a pair in many films, including Karppooram (1967) which he won the Tamil Nadu State Film Award for Best Actor. AVM Rajan has two daughters, the elder daughter Mahalakshmi was an actress between the 80s–90s. On 19 January 1984, through a personal encounter with God, Rajan converted and there after became a full-time Christian preacher since 1988 and since then has stopped acting in movies and dramas. His wife Pushpalatha is a Catholic by birth. She hails from Coimbatore. Following Rajan's conversion, his family too is serving full-time Ministry.

Filmography
Actor

Producer
Oorum Uravum
Lorry Driver Rajakannu
Nandri

References

1935 births
20th-century Indian Christian clergy
Indian male film actors
Tamil male actors
Living people
Tamil Nadu State Film Awards winners
People from Pudukkottai
Converts to Christianity